Onehunga is a suburb of Auckland in New Zealand and the location of the Port of Onehunga, the city's small port on the Manukau Harbour.

Onehunga is a residential and light-industrial suburb. There are almost 1,000 commercial and industrial businesses in the area. Onehunga stretches south from Royal Oak to the northern shore of the Manukau Harbour. To the east are the areas of Oranga and Te Papapa; to the west, Hillsborough. On the southern shore of the Manukau Harbour, and linked to Onehunga by two bridges, is the suburb of Māngere Bridge.

Geography 
Onehunga lies on the Auckland isthmus, on the northern shore of Mangere Inlet, an arm of the Manukau Harbour, and just south of the volcanic cone of Maungakiekie / One Tree Hill. The Port of Onehunga, on Manukau Harbour, is now much smaller than Auckland's east coast port on the Waitematā Harbour, but in the 19th century it was the larger. The wharves are located on reclaimed land bordering a low volcanic crater called Te Hopua, once occupied by a tidal lagoon opening to the southwest, but which has also been reclaimed.

Onehunga's southwestern side, near the Manukau Harbour, lost its direct waterfront access when the Southwest Motorway was built there in the 1970s. Only a tidal lagoon remains on the city side, though in 2008, there were proposals that the motorway (which was to be widened) could be sunk into a trench to provide direct access to the harbour again. In 2013, a project was underway to restore the Onehunga foreshore, to be connected to the city-side park by a pedestrian and cycle bridge over State Highway 20.

A substantial aquifer flows underground beneath Onehunga, feed by rainwater soaking through the lava flows around Maungakiekie / One Tree Hill. Up to 21 million litres of potable water a day is pumped from the Onehunga aquifer and treated in a local plant before being supplied to Onehunga as part of the Auckland water supply network. While most of Auckland's potable water comes from reservoirs in the Hunua and Waitākere Ranges, or from the Waikato River, the Onehunga aquifer provides around 5%. In contrast, while the isthmus's other major aquifer, the Western Springs aquifer, is also feed by water seeping through lava fields, it is no longer used as a source of potable water.

History

Etymology
The name Onehunga is from the Māori language and means a "beach composed of mixed sand and mud" or "alluvial soil", according to Williams's Dictionary of the Maori Language.

Claims have been made for other names and meanings. Ethnographer George Graham was told by one Māori informant that the name was Ōnehunga, with the etymology of ō (the place of) nehunga (burial), but Graham said that was later contradicted. He said that the name was actually Oneunga (Oneūnga in modern orthography), meaning one (beach or sand) ūnga (landing), in reference to canoes being drawn up there. He also said that Onehunga meant "friable" or "pulverous soil" and that this was "a very correct name".

The New Zealand Geographic Board approved Onehunga as the official name in 2019.

Māori origins 

Onehunga was close to one of the richest areas of the Auckland isthmus, and saw many battles between Māori groups in pre-European times. In the late 1830s, before Europeans arrived in larger numbers in the area, it was the main settlement for Ngāti Whātua, who had moved back to the northern shore of the Manukau Harbour after retreating to the Waikato during the Musket Wars.

Early European town 

The European village of Onehunga was founded as a Fencible settlement by Governor Grey. The Fencibles were former soldiers, many of them Irish, who were granted land to settle on, with the implied understanding that if Māori threatened the Auckland isthmus, they would defend it. Onehunga was the first village for Fencibles in New Zealand. Grey chose the site in 1846 and the Fencibles arrived in 1847.

European settlement of the Manukau Harbour area was begun from and long focused on Onehunga. When the New Zealand Wars later occurred, it was mostly fought with regular soldiers rather than Fencibles. Naval volunteers based at Onehunga raided Māori territories on the south side of the harbour during the wars.

During the 19th century most shipping between New Zealand and Great Britain came to Onehunga, via South Africa and Australia. While some shipping entered the Waitematā Harbour and docked at Auckland, much of it entered the Manukau Heads and docked at Onehunga, thus saving several days sailing around North Cape. The Manukau Harbour was treacherous however (as evidenced by the sinking of HMS Orpheus in 1863, killing 180 people) but the coastal Steamship lines carried virtually all passenger and freight trade between Auckland and Wellington via Wanganui and Onehunga.

Onehunga was also the main route to and from the south, as most shipping routes were shorter via the western coast of the North Island than around the east coast to the Waitematā Harbour. Until 1908 a steamer from Onehunga was the fastest means of travel from Auckland to Wellington, the capital of the colony (initially the sea journey went all the way, then later it connected to the New Plymouth Express instead). In 1909 a typical coastal freight connection was a steamer from Onehunga to locations such as Raglan, Kawhia and Waitara. Onehunga was the Northern Steamship's base for serving the west coast, including also Āwhitu, Hokianga and Waiuku.

By the First World War Onehunga was no longer an important commercial port, this was partly because of a general increase in the size of ships, which meant the Waitematā Harbour was favoured especially as it was wider and deeper. More significant however was the completion of the North Island Main Trunk railway in 1908 – this effectively made the coastal passenger and freight steamship trade on both coasts of the country largely unprofitable. The port does still serve coastal traders and some local fishing, there is also a cement and sand company which maintains facilities at Onehunga.

In 1874, the town of Onehunga had 2,044 inhabitants, compared with Wellington's 10,547, reflecting the importance of the smaller port towns during an age when New Zealand was booming, but internal transport links were still rudimentary. In 1876, Onehunga was declared a borough with a mayor and 16 councillors.

From 1883, until around 1903 when it was partially demolished, the Onehunga Ironworks was situated in the town. It operated until around 1895. The ironworks was located opposite the original Onehunga railway station. Its chimney and some structures survived into the late 1960s.

From 1885, the town became known for its wool industry (several firms maintained factories here including one which produced blankets). This weaving industry saved the area from more serious decline when the shipping trade reduced after 1908.  As the centre of the Auckland isthmus became covered by suburban developments the Onehunga foreshore became an attraction for families from Mount Eden, Epsom and One Tree Hill. The beach at Onehunga became popular after the electric tram route was completed in 1906 and the Tea Rooms situated at the tram terminus, overlooking the harbour were an attraction in their own right.

After the Municipal Abattoir was relocated from Freeman's Bay to Westfield and Southdown, Onehunga started to suffer from the toxic discharges the freezing works pumped into the harbour. This effectively put an end to Onehunga's emerging role as a seaside resort and also made it a less attractive place to live. By the late 1930s the water quality of the harbour was poor, with a discernible downturn in fish and wildlife numbers. It became unsafe to eat any shellfish for example and fish numbers dwindled. The installation of a large sewerage treatment plant in the harbour in the 1960s only made things worse. Since the decommissioning of the freezing works at Westfield and Southdown and a redesign of the Manukau Sewerage Treatment Works, the quality of the water has increased significantly.

In 1893, Elizabeth Yates became mayor of Onehunga. While she was defeated at the polls only one year later, she was the first woman in the British Empire to hold such a post.

Merging with Auckland
While in 1891 Onehunga was one of the "25 most populous urban areas/towns of New Zealand", with about 5,000 inhabitants, by the First World War it had ceased to be a port of importance. It gained a new role as a shopping and service centre as it was engulfed by the suburban development of Auckland, and was amalgamated with Auckland City in 1989.

Onehunga had for a short time Auckland's first zoo. However, the zoological garden that John James Boyd created near today's Royal Oak did not meet with local approval – mainly due to concerns about the smells and crowds.  Eleven years after its November 1911 opening, the animals were bought and transferred to the new Auckland Zoo at Western Springs.

Although the area was a predominantly working-class suburb for much of the 20th century, it has undergone some gentrification since the 1990s. In recent times, many of the bungalows of the 1920s (along with the earlier villas) have undergone restoration and Dress Smart has reinvigorated commerce in the area. Secondary schools located conveniently are Onehunga High School, One Tree Hill College and Marcellin College. Some boys also attend St Peter's College.

The hit TV show Back of the Y was filmed in 'Auckland's beautiful Onehunga'.

Local government 
Onehunga had its own local government authority, Onehunga Borough Council, which started in 1877. It merged into Auckland City Council in 1989. All of Auckland's councils amalgamated into Auckland Council in November 2010.

Mayors of Onehunga Borough Council  
 John Dickenson Jackson, 1877–1877
 James William Waller, 1877–1878
 Thomas Geroge Blakey, 1878–1879
 George Codlin, 1879–1880
 Thomas Geroge Blakey, 1880–1881
 George Codlin, 1881–1883
 Dr. William George Scott, 1883–1884
 John Dickenson Jackson, 1884–1885
 Dr. William George Scott, 1885–1886
 Dr. William Robert Close Erson, 1886–1887
 Charles Colville Fleming, 1887–1888
 Captain Michael Yates, 1888–1892
 Dr. William Robert Close Erson, 1892–1893
 Elizabeth Yates, 1893–1894
 Donald Alexander Sutherland, 1894–1897
 Frederick William Court, 1897–1898
 Dr. William Robert Close Erson, 1898–1901
 Donald Alexander Sutherland, 1901–1904
 Angus William Gordon, 1905–1905
 John Rowe, 1906–1917
 John James Boyd, 1917–1917
 John Stoupe, 1917–1919
 John Park, 1919–1923
 James Edward Cowell, 1923–1927
 William Charles Coldicutt, 1927–1929
 Edward Morton, 1929–1935
 John Park, 1935–1938
 Archer Garside, 1944–1959
 Leon Abraham Manning, 1959–1968
 Thomas Victor Gerrard Beeson, 1968–1974
 Leon Abraham Manning, 1974–1980
 John Lawrence Henderson, 1980–1986
 Graham Johnson Mountjoy, 1986–1989

Demographics
Onehunga comprises four statistical areas. Onehunga West, North and Central are primarily residential/commercial. Onehunga-Te Papapa Industrial is primarily industrial.

Residential area

The residential area had a population of 10,902 at the 2018 New Zealand census, an increase of 693 people (6.8%) since the 2013 census, and an increase of 1,284 people (13.3%) since the 2006 census. There were 3,909 households, comprising 5,397 males and 5,505 females, giving a sex ratio of 0.98 males per female, with 2,007 people (18.4%) aged under 15 years, 2,283 (20.9%) aged 15 to 29, 5,469 (50.2%) aged 30 to 64, and 1,143 (10.5%) aged 65 or older.

Ethnicities were 57.0% European/Pākehā, 10.4% Māori, 16.3% Pacific peoples, 26.9% Asian, and 3.6% other ethnicities. People may identify with more than one ethnicity.

The percentage of people born overseas was 37.7, compared with 27.1% nationally.

Although some people chose not to answer the census's question about religious affiliation, 43.9% had no religion, 39.1% were Christian, 0.5% had Māori religious beliefs, 5.2% were Hindu, 2.2% were Muslim, 1.8% were Buddhist and 2.1% had other religions.

Of those at least 15 years old, 3,324 (37.4%) people had a bachelor's or higher degree, and 1,041 (11.7%) people had no formal qualifications. 2,166 people (24.4%) earned over $70,000 compared to 17.2% nationally. The employment status of those at least 15 was that 5,142 (57.8%) people were employed full-time, 1,143 (12.8%) were part-time, and 333 (3.7%) were unemployed.

Industrial area

Onehunga-Te Papapa Industrial had a population of 870 at the 2018 New Zealand census, an increase of 30 people (3.6%) since the 2013 census, and an increase of 252 people (40.8%) since the 2006 census. There were 369 households, comprising 435 males and 432 females, giving a sex ratio of 1.01 males per female. The median age was 36.0 years (compared with 37.4 years nationally), with 114 people (13.1%) aged under 15 years, 204 (23.4%) aged 15 to 29, 441 (50.7%) aged 30 to 64, and 108 (12.4%) aged 65 or older.

Ethnicities were 53.1% European/Pākehā, 14.5% Māori, 13.8% Pacific peoples, 28.3% Asian, and 5.9% other ethnicities. People may identify with more than one ethnicity.

The percentage of people born overseas was 44.8, compared with 27.1% nationally.

Although some people chose not to answer the census's question about religious affiliation, 41.0% had no religion, 41.0% were Christian, 0.3% had Māori religious beliefs, 4.8% were Hindu, 3.4% were Muslim, 2.8% were Buddhist and 2.1% had other religions.

Of those at least 15 years old, 210 (27.8%) people had a bachelor's or higher degree, and 96 (12.7%) people had no formal qualifications. The median income was $38,300, compared with $31,800 nationally. 141 people (18.7%) earned over $70,000 compared to 17.2% nationally. The employment status of those at least 15 was that 441 (58.3%) people were employed full-time, 72 (9.5%) were part-time, and 42 (5.6%) were unemployed.

Foreshore 

Onehunga's shore is heavily modified by human use. The old volcanic basin that used to link to the Manukau Harbour was filled in, with shorelines reclaimed and straightened for human use (Port of Onehunga, industrial uses and sports fields). The New Zealand State Highway 20 extension further disrupted Onehunga's connection to the shore in the 1970s.

This loss of amenity and space was one of the major complaints of local groups during negotiations over further motorway widening connected to the Māngere Bridge duplication. Proponents of a restored beach eventually won a $18 million commitment from Transit New Zealand (now NZ Transport Agency), which was topped up by a further $10 million from Auckland City Council. The sum is to fund a large-scale new shoreline west of the motorway, connected to downtown Onehunga with new pedestrian/cyclebridges, and creating 11ha of new beach and headland landscape. Three designs out of seven initial competitors have been shortlisted for further work as of late 2009, and it is hoped to complete the restoration of the foreshore by mid-2014.

In mid-2011, the plans for the restoration works were clarified further, and provided for public comment, setting out a  reclamation area with sanded beaches, new green open space and several new headlands. The area is to receive a new boat ramp, and walk and cycleways including a new walking and cycling bridge over the motorway to Onehunga. Construction has started on 19 November 2012.

The newly-named Taumanu Reserve was officially opened to the public on 14 November 2015, in an event attended by over a thousand people.

Transport 

Onehunga Line rail services carry passengers between Onehunga railway station and central Auckland's Britomart Transport Centre along the Onehunga Branch line to a junction with the main line at Penrose station. The Campaign for Better Transport campaigned to have the line extended south from Onehunga across the SH20 Manukau Harbour second crossing bridge to Auckland Airport. Former Auckland Mayor Len Brown also campaigned for this Auckland Airport Line, though it will likely only be developed after the City Rail Link is completed.

Electric services began running between Britomart and Onehunga on 28 April 2014.

Queen St, named after Queen Victoria, led onto the 1920s Māngere Bridge and thence to the suburb of the same name. This was one of the main land routes south out of Auckland and the usual route to the airport until the motorway and regional road system in the 1970s diverted the through traffic away from the Onehunga and Mangere Bridge.

In 1973, Queen St was closed to through traffic, and on 2 April 1973 was renamed Onehunga Mall and reopened as a pedestrian shopping precinct.  In 1996, Onehunga Mall was reopened to traffic.

Until 1956, a tram line ran all the way from the Auckland CBD to Onehunga.

In 2021 there was a push by the Maungakiekie-Tāmaki Local Board to establish low traffic neighbourhoods keeping through-traffic on the main roads. It adds temporary traffic filtering and interim pocket parks to a residential area of Onehunga, in order to redirect traffic to the arterials, and create quieter local streets. The trail was stop in May 2021 after serious concerns to public safety after vandalism and disruption at the project site form local residents that felt the disruption to traffic was intolerable.

Notable buildings

 Former Post Office, 1902 John Campbell Government Architect. Princes Street & Onehunga Mall. One of the earliest examples of the work of this prolific architect.
 Anglican Church of St Peter, Onehunga Mall & Church Sts. The Selwyn church built in 1848 has been relocated. The existing building dates from the 1980s and incorporates a gothic revival tower from the 1930s. The churchyard contains the graves of many of Onehunga's early settlers and some of the dead from the Wreck of the Orpheus.
 The Carnegie Free Library in Princes Street opened in 1912. It was one of eighteen in New Zealand built with funds from the American philanthropist Andrew Carnegie. Its services were eventually absorbed into the public library system and the building has recently been renovated as a restaurant.
 Church of the Assumption at the corner of Church & Galway Streets. A Roman Catholic church of 1889, the architect Thomas Mahoney. Once standing in open countryside this is a handsome example of a masonry Gothic church. The cemetery contains the graves of many of Onehunga's early settlers.
 Scoria Blockhouse – 19 Princes Street. A 19th century scoria building used during the Land wars of the 1860s, possibly as a hospital. Once part of the Jandells factory.
 The Landing – 2 Onehunga Harbour Rd. This 19th Century Pub once stood on one of the busiest waterfronts in the country. It is virtually the sole survivor of the period when Onehunga was an important port for coastal shipping in New Zealand as well as commerce with Australia. In the 19th century most of the shipping came from Great Britain via Cape Town & Melbourne and came to either Wellington or here to Onehunga.
 War Memorial Arch, Jellicoe Park, Quadrant Road & Grey Street. Opened in 1923 by the Governor General, Lord Jellicoe, Jellicoe Park is the site of Onehunga's Public Swimming Pools. Near the War Memorial Arch is located the splendid John Park Memorial Fountain which is illuminated on special occasions.

Also in Jellicoe Park is a collection of buildings illustrating the early history of the area:

 The Blockhouse in 1859, a brick building relocated from Princes St.
 Journeys End a replica of a wooden 1850 house, relocated here in 1968,
 Laishley House in 1859, relocated from Princes St in 1985,
 Selwyn St Settlers Cottage in 1850.

Across Grey Street from the park is
 St Peter's Scout Den. This is the 1848 Selwyn Church, relocated here in 1980.

Nearby in Selwyn Street is
 The former Onehunga Primary School 1901, now a community centre this building has been recently restored.

In Alfred Street is 
 The former Onehunga railway station building, relocated to 38 Alfred Street, headquarters of the Railway Enthusiasts Society Inc.

Commerce

Dress Smart Auckland opened in Onehunga in 1995, and expanded in 2005. It now covers an area of 13,217 m², with up to 101 tenancies and 735 carparks.

Education

Onehunga High School is a secondary school (years 9–13) with a roll of  students.

Onehunga Primary School is a contributing primary school  (years 1–6)  with a roll of  students.

St Joseph's Catholic School is a state-integrated full primary school (years 1–8) with a roll of  students.

Golden Grove School is a private Montessori full primary school (years 1–8) with a roll of  students.

All these schools are coeducational. Rolls are as of

Sport
Onehunga is home to Onehunga Sports who compete in the Lotto Sport Italia NRFL Premier.

Notable people
 

Margaret Beveridge Stevenson (1865–1941), a New Zealand Bahai

References

The Lively Capital, Auckland 1840–1865. Una Platts. Avon Fine Prints Limited New Zealand 1971.
Onehunga Art & Heritage Walks, Onehunga Mainstreet Programme 2003.

External links
Discover Onehunga – all about Onehunga (site maintained by Onehunga Business Association)
Photographs of Onehunga held in Auckland Libraries' heritage collections.

Suburbs of Auckland
Port cities in New Zealand
Populated places around the Manukau Harbour